The Canada Memorial in Green Park, London, United Kingdom, commemorates members of the Canadian Forces killed during the First and Second World Wars. It was designed by the Canadian sculptor Pierre Granche, erected in 1992 and unveiled by Queen Elizabeth II in 1994. The memorial was the result of lobbying and fund raising, much of it in Canada, by the former Canadian media tycoon Conrad Black.

History and description
Pierre Granche, one of Canada's foremost sculptors, won the commission as the result of a competition, sculpted the memorial from red granite; it is divided by a walkway into two distinct halves, representing Britain and Canada's joint participation in World Wars I and II. The inclined sculpture is inset with 506 bronze maple leaves (the Canadian emblem) and the country's coat of arms. Water flows across the sloping surface and creates an illusion of floating leaves. An inscription at the centre of the memorial reads:

"In two world wars one million Canadians came to Britain and joined the fight for freedom. From danger shared, our friendship prospers."

From 2004, following a change in fortunes of the memorial's patron, Conrad Black, the memorial fell into disrepair and became subject to debate concerning its maintenance. In 2008, the Canadian Government assumed responsibility for the upkeep of the memorial: announcing "Our Government will ensure that the Canada Memorial in London, England, has the long-term care and upkeep it deserves as a lasting and fitting tribute to our nation's truest heroes."  As of October 2011, the memorial was fenced off and not operational, despite £50,000 spent by Veterans Affairs Canada in renovations and upkeep. After refurbishment of corroded pipes and fittings, the memorial has now reopened.

Canada Memorial Foundation
At the same time as the Memorial was being built and unveiled, the same group of people behind it raised an endowment called the Canada Memorial Foundation.  Since the early 1990s that endowment has been sending British students to do post-graduate studies at Canadian universities.  It is managed by volunteer trustees and is completely separate from the Green Park Memorial.  However, the Foundation shares similar aims of encouraging the connections and cooperation between Britain and Canada.

See also
 Canada Gate
 Canadian war memorials

Notes

References 
Veterans Affairs Canada accessed 28 October 2011.
Canada at War accessed 11 February 2010.
CBC News accessed 2 February 2010.
Internnation Business Times accessed 11 February 2010.
Edwardian London accessed 11 February 2010.
Robinson, John Martin (1999). Buckingham Palace. Published by The Royal Collection, St. James's Palace, London .
The Royal Parks, St. James's accessed 2 February 2010.
The Toronto Star Article by Mitch Potter August 2007. accessed 11 February 2010.
Worcestershire County Council accessed 2 February 2010.

External links 
 Interactive map showing location of Canada Gate and the Canada Memorial accessed 2 February 2010.

Canada–United Kingdom relations
Canada Memorial (London)
Military memorials in London
Tourist attractions in the City of Westminster
Buildings and structures in Green Park
World War I memorials in the United Kingdom
World War II memorials in the United Kingdom